Androulla Vassiliou (born 30 November 1943) is a Cypriot and European politician. Between March 2008 and February 2010, she was the European Commissioner for Health, and then, until November 2014, the European Commissioner for Education, Culture, Multilingualism and Youth. Vassiliou is very active in social and cultural fields particularly within the UN and EU. In Cyprus she has held many important posts and is on the Board of many public and private companies.

Legal career
Vassiliou was born in Paphos. Between 1961 and 1964 she studied law at Middle Temple (Inn of Court) in London, United Kingdom and then between 1964 and 1966 she studied international affairs at the London Institute of World Affairs (United Kingdom). She then returned to Cyprus in 1968 to practice law while acting as legal advisor to the Standard Chartered Bank and then the Bank of Cyprus (also being on the board of various corporations). In 1988 she ended her legal practice when her husband, George Vassiliou, became President of Cyprus.

Political career
Vassiliou served as First Lady of Cyprus from 1988 to 1993.

Vassiliou was elected to the House of Representatives of Cyprus in 1996, for the Movement of United Democrats, and re-elected in 2001 until 2006. During this time she served on the European Affairs Committee and the Joint Parliamentary Committee of Cyprus and the EU She was also an Alternate Representative of the Cyprus to the European Convention which drew up the European Constitution.

Between 2001 and 2006 she was Vice President of the European Liberal Democrat and Reform Party, and the chairperson of the European Liberal Women's Network.

In February 2008 Vassiliou was nominated to succeed Markos Kyprianou as European Commissioner for Health. On 3 March 2008 she took over from him in the European Commission and faced a hearing before the European Parliament in early April 2008; she was approved on 9 April 2008 by 446 to 7 with 29 abstentions. Under the Second Barroso Commission, from February 2010, she was given the portfolio of Education, Culture, Multilingualism and Youth.

Other activities and personal life
Since 2002 she has been chairperson of the board of trustees of the Cyprus Oncology Centre and she has also been President of the Cyprus Federation of Business and Professional Women since 1996.

She was involved in the United Nations Association of Cyprus, being elected as President of it for four consecutive terms, participated in numerous human rights conferences. In 1991 she was elected President of the World Federation of United Nations Associations and re-elected for two terms before being made an honorary president.

She is married to George Vassiliou, former President of Cyprus, with whom she has three children. Her hobbies are music, walking, swimming and reading. She speaks Greek, English and French.

Androulla Vassiliou caused an outcry about a rape case, after her tweet on internet, perceived as victim-blaming and chided for victim shaming a 24-year-old woman after being drugged at a Thessaloniki-located, Greece, hotel on New Year's Eve. In a third tweet, Vassiliou apologised, saying she had been misunderstood.

References

External links
 Androulla Vassiliou Official Media Gallery 
  Archived on 3 November 2014.

 

|-

|-

|-

Living people
1943 births
Cypriot European Commissioners
Members of the House of Representatives (Cyprus)
First ladies of Cyprus
Cypriot women lawyers
20th-century Cypriot women politicians
20th-century Cypriot politicians
Democratic Party (Cyprus) politicians
Greek Cypriot people
Women European Commissioners
21st-century Cypriot women politicians
21st-century Cypriot politicians
20th-century Cypriot lawyers